Karen Marie Lunn (born 21 March 1966) is an Australian professional golfer. She turned professional in 1985 and has spent much of her career on the Ladies European Tour, where she has won several tournaments including a Women's British Open title in 1993 (before that tournament was an LPGA major championship). She topped the Order of Merit in 1993.

In 2004, Lunn was named the Ladies European Tour's Chairman of the Board.  She was born in Sydney, Australia, and now lives in Surrey, England.

Professional wins (16)

Ladies European Tour wins (10)
1986 Borlänge Ladies Open
1988 Godiva European Masters
1990 BMW European Masters
1992 Slovenian Ladies Open
1993 KRP World Ladies Classic, Weetabix Women's British Open
1997 American Express Tour Player's Classic, Open de France Dames
2010 Portugal Ladies Open
2012 Lalla Meryem Cup

ALPG Tour wins (4)
1990 Daikyo Ladies Challenge Series 2
2004 Eden Country Club Pro-Am
2008 Peugeot Kangaroo Valley ALPG Classic
2012 ActewAGL Royal Canberra Ladies Classic

Ladies Asia Golf Circuit wins (1)
1988 Thailand Ladies Open

Other wins (1)
1992 Malaysian Open

References

External links

Australian female golfers
ALPG Tour golfers
Ladies European Tour golfers
Golfers from Sydney
Sportswomen from New South Wales
People from Surrey
1966 births
Living people